The 2010 show was hosted by Mike Epps. DJ Khaled was the host DJ and DJ Premier DJed the cyphers.

Performances
 "B.M.F. (Blowin' Money Fast)"/"MC Hammer" - Rick Ross with Diddy and DJ Khaled
 "Too Legit to Quit" - MC Hammer
 "Speakers Going Hammer"/"Pretty Boy Swag" - Soulja Boy
 "Hard in da Paint"/"No Hands" - Waka Flocka Flame feat. Roscoe Dash
 "Bed Intruder Song" - Antoine Dodson & Michael Gregory of The Gregory Brothers
 "Gucci Time" - Gucci Mane feat. Swizz Beatz
 "You Aint No DJ" - Big Boi feat. Yelawolf
 "Who Dat"/"Blow Up" - J. Cole
 "Salute" - Dipset
 "Don't Let Me Fall" - B.o.B
 "Teach Me How to Dougie" - Cali Swag District
 "The Humpty Dance"/"I Get Around" - Shock G & Money-B of Digital Underground

Cyphers

 Internet Exclusive Cypher 1 - Vado, Reychesta, & Farnsworth Bentley
 Internet Exclusive Cypher 2 - Laws, Reema Major, & Nick Javas
 Cypher 1 - Wiz Khalifa, Bones Brigante, Yelawolf, & Raekwon
 Cypher 2 - Tyga, Kuniva, Diamond, & Royce Da 5'9"
 Cypher 3 - Ice Cube with his sons Doughboy & OMG and Rev Run with his sons Diggy & Jo-Jo
 Cypher 4 - Reek Da Villain, Zawcain, & Mickey Factz
 Cypher 5 - Pusha T, Big Sean, CyHi Da Prynce, Common, & Kanye West of G.O.O.D. Music
 Ghana Exclusive Cypher - D-Black Da Ghana Bwouy, Sarkodie, Kwaku-T, Ayigbe Edem, Babyg, Tinny, & Reggie Rockstone

Winners and nominations

Best Hip Hop Video 
 Jay-Z & Alicia Keys – "Empire State of Mind"
 B.o.B featuring Bruno Mars – "Nothin' on You"
 Drake – "Find Your Love"
 Jay-Z featuring Rihanna & Kanye West – "Run This Town" 
 Jay-Z featuring Swizz Beatz – "On to the Next One"

Reese’s Perfect Combo Award 
 Jay-Z & Alicia Keys – "Empire State of Mind"
 B.o.B featuring Bruno Mars – "Nothin' on You"
 Diddy-Dirty Money featuring Rick Ross & Nicki Minaj – "Hello Good Morning (Remix)"
 DJ Khaled featuring Rick Ross, T-Pain, Busta Rhymes, P. Diddy, Fabolous, Fat Joe, Jadakiss & Nicki Minaj – "All I Do Is Win (Remix)"
 Drake featuring Lil Wayne, Kanye West & Eminem – "Forever"

Best Live Performer 
 Jay-Z
 Busta Rhymes 
 Drake 
 Kanye West
 Lil Wayne

Lyricist of the Year 
 Eminem
 Drake
 Lil Wayne
 Nicki Minaj
 Jay-Z

Video Director of the Year  
 Hype Williams
 Benny Boom
 Chris Robinson
 Gil Green
 Mr. Boomtown

Producer of the Year 
 Swizz Beatz
 Boi-1da
 Drumma Boy
 Lex Luger
 Polow Da Don

MVP of the Year 
 Drake
 B.o.B
 Eminem
 Jay-Z
 Rick Ross

Track of the Year 
Only the producer of the track nominated in this category.
 "BMF" – Produced by Lex Luger (Rick Ross featuring Styles P)
 "Airplanes" – Produced by Alex da Kid & DJ Frank E (B.o.B featuring Hayley Williams)
 "All I Do Is Win" – Produced by DJ Nasty & LVM (DJ Khaled featuring T-Pain, Ludacris, Rick Ross & Snoop Dogg)
 "BedRock" – Produced by Kane Beatz (Young Money featuring Lloyd)
 "Empire State of Mind" – Produced by Alexander Shuckburgh (Jay-Z & Alicia Keys)

CD of the Year 
 Jay-Z – The Blueprint 3
 B.o.B – B.o.B Presents: The Adventures of Bobby Ray
 Eminem – Recovery
 Drake – Thank Me Later
 Rick Ross – Teflon Don

DJ of the Year 
 DJ Khaled
 DJ Drama
 Funkmaster Flex
 DJ Holliday
 DJ Tony Neal

Rookie of the Year 
 Nicki Minaj
Chiddy Bang
J. Cole
Roscoe Dash
Waka Flocka Flame

Made-You-Look Award (Best Hip-Hop Style) 
 Nicki Minaj
 B.o.B
 Jay-Z
 T.I.
 Kanye West

Best Club Banger 
 Rick Ross featuring Styles P – "BMF" (Produced by Lex Luger)
 Diddy-Dirty Money featuring T.I. & Rick Ross – "Hello Good Morning" (Produced by Danja)
 DJ Khaled featuring T-Pain, Ludacris, Rick Ross & Snoop Dogg – "All I Do Is Win" (Produced by DJ Nasty & LVM)
 Young Jeezy featuring Plies – "Lose My Mind" (Produced by Drumma Boy)
 Waka Flocka Flame – "O Let's Do It" (Produced by L-Don Beatz)

Hustler of the Year 
 Diddy
 Drake
 Jay-Z
 Nicki Minaj
 T.I.

Verizon People’s Champ Award 
 Nicki Minaj – "Your Love"
 B.o.B featuring Bruno Mars – "Nothin' on You"
 Eminem – "Not Afraid"
 Gucci Mane – "Lemonade"
 Cali Swag District – "Teach Me How to Dougie"
 Drake – "Over"

Best Hip Hop Blog Site 
WorldStarHipHop.com
AllHipHop.com
NahRight.com
RapRadar.com
ThisIs50.com

I Am Hip Hop 
 Salt-N-Pepa

References

BET Hip Hop Awards
2010 music awards